Kgatelopele Local Municipality is a local municipality in the ZF Mgcawu District Municipality of the Northern Cape in South Africa. Kgatelopele is a Setswana name that means "progress".

Main places
The 2001 census divided the municipality into the following main places:

Politics 

The municipal council consists of eleven members elected by mixed-member proportional representation. Six councillors are elected by first-past-the-post voting in six wards, while the remaining five are chosen from party lists so that the total number of party representatives is proportional to the number of votes received. In the election of 1 November 2021 no party obtained a majority on the council. The following table shows the results of the election.

'

References

External links
 Official website

Local municipalities of the ZF Mgcawu District Municipality